The Sanford F. Conley House is a historic home located at Columbia, Missouri.  It is an ornate 19th century residence in the Italianate architectural style.  Built in 1868 as a residence for his family by the businessman Sanford Francis Conley (1838–1890).  The house is near the University of Missouri campus.  After being added to the National Register of Historic Places in 1973, the house was purchased by the university and houses the school's "excellence in teaching" program.

See also
Chatol

References

Houses on the National Register of Historic Places in Missouri
Italianate architecture in Missouri
Houses completed in 1868
University of Missouri campus
Houses in Columbia, Missouri
National Register of Historic Places in Boone County, Missouri